Their Satanic Majesties Request is the 6th British and 8th American studio album by the English rock band the Rolling Stones, released in December 1967 by Decca Records in the UK and by London Records in the US. It is their first to be released in identical versions in both countries. The album's title is a play on the "Her Britannic Majesty requests and requires..." text that appears inside a British passport.

The band experimented with a psychedelic sound on Satanic Majesties, incorporating unconventional elements such as Mellotron, sound effects, string arrangements, and African rhythms. The band produced the album themselves as their manager/producer Andrew Loog Oldham had departed. The prolonged recording process was marked by drug use, court appearances, and jail terms by members of the band. The original LP cover features a lenticular image by photographer Michael Cooper.

Satanic Majesties received mixed reactions from critics and members of the group itself. The album was criticised as being derivative of the contemporaneous work of the Beatles, particularly their June 1967 release Sgt. Pepper's Lonely Hearts Club Band, with the similarities extending to the LP's cover. In subsequent decades, however, it has gradually risen in critical reputation. Following the album's release, the Rolling Stones abandoned their psychedelic style for a stripped-down return to their roots in blues music.

Recording
Recording of Their Satanic Majesties Request began just after the release of Between the Buttons on 20 January 1967.
Because of court appearances and jail terms, the entire band was seldom present in the studio at one time, making recording of the album lengthy and disjointed. Band members frequently arrived with guests in tow, further interfering with productivity. One of the more level-headed members of the band during this time, Bill Wyman, wary of psychedelic drugs, wrote the song "In Another Land" to parody the Stones' current goings-on. In his 2002 book Rolling with the Stones, Wyman describes the situations in the studio:

The Stones experimented with many new instruments and sound effects during the sessions, including Mellotron, theremin, short wave radio static, and string arrangements by then-future Led Zeppelin bassist John Paul Jones. Their producer and manager Andrew Loog Oldham, already fed up with the band's lack of focus, distanced himself from them following their drug bust and finally quit, leaving them without a producer. As a result, Their Satanic Majesties Request would be the Stones' first self-produced album. Mick Jagger later opined this was not for the best, while expressing disintegration for some of the tracks.

In another interview, Jagger stated:

Some of the album's songs were recorded under various working titles, some appearing radically different from the final titles. These working titles include: "Acid in the Grass" ("In Another Land"), "I Want People to Know" ("2000 Man"), "Flowers in Your Bonnet" ("She's a Rainbow"), "Fly My Kite" ("The Lantern"), "Toffee Apple" ("2000 Light Years from Home"), and "Surprise Me" ("On with the Show"). In 1998, a bootleg box set of eight CDs with outtakes from the Satanic sessions was released, and it shows the band developing the songs over multiple takes as well as the experimentation that went into the recording of the album.

Title and packaging

The working title of the album was Cosmic Christmas, or The Rolling Stones' Cosmic Christmas – in the hidden coda titled "Cosmic Christmas" (following "Sing This All Together (See What Happens)"), Wyman says in a slowed-down voice: "We wish you a merry Christmas, we wish you a merry Christmas, and a happy New Year!'" The album was released in South Africa and the Philippines as The Stones Are Rolling because of the word "Satanic" in the title.

One proposed cover, a photograph of Jagger naked on a cross, was scrapped by the record company for being "in bad taste". The initial LP of the album featured a three-dimensional picture of the band on the cover by photographer Michael Cooper. When viewed in a certain way, the lenticular image shows the band members' faces turning towards each other with the exception of Jagger, whose hands appear crossed in front of him. Looking closely on its cover, one can see the faces of each of the four Beatles, reportedly a response to the Beatles' inclusion of a Shirley Temple doll wearing a "Welcome the Rolling Stones" sweater on the cover of Sgt. Pepper. Later editions replaced the glued-on three-dimensional image with a photograph, due to high production costs. A limited edition LP version in the 1980s reprinted the original 3D cover design; immediately following the reissue, it was claimed that the master materials for reprinting the 3D cover were intentionally destroyed, implying that faithful recreations of the cover would no longer be possible, but this has since been proven false by numerous re-issues. The 3D album cover was featured, although shrunk down, for the Japanese SHM-CD release in 2010.

The original cover design called for the lenticular image to take up the entire front cover, but finding this to be prohibitively expensive it was decided to reduce the size of the photo and surround it with the blue-and-white graphic design.

The entire cover design is elaborate, with a dense photo collage filling most of the inside cover (along with a maze) designed by Michael Cooper, and a painting by Tony Meeuwissen on the back cover depicting the four elements (Earth, Water, Fire, and Air).  In some editions the blue-and-white wisps on the front cover are used in a red-and-white version on the paper inner sleeve.  The inner-cover collage has dozens of images, taken from reproductions of old master paintings (Ingres, Poussin, da Vinci, among others), Indian mandalas and portraits, astronomy (including a large image of the planet Saturn), flowers, world maps, etc.  The maze on the inside cover of the UK and US releases cannot be completed: a wall at about a half radius in from the lower left corner means one can never arrive at the goal labeled "It's Here" in the centre of the maze.

It was the first of four Stones albums to feature a novelty cover; the others were the zipper on Sticky Fingers (1971), the cut-out faces on Some Girls (1978), and the stickers on Undercover (1983).

At some point around 1997 rumors were first heard that the album existed as a promo version including a silk padding. A pink padded version was presented by photo accompanied by a letter from the Decca Copyright Department, but it was shown that the letter does not match the album it was intended to authenticate making it almost entirely certain that this was a forgery.

Release and reception

Released in December 1967, Their Satanic Majesties Request reached No. 3 in the UK and No. 2 in the US (easily going gold), but its commercial performance declined rapidly. It was soon viewed as a pretentious, poorly conceived attempt to outdo the Beatles and Sgt. Pepper's Lonely Hearts Club Band (released in May 1967), often explained by drug trials and excesses in contemporary musical fashion, although John Lennon and Paul McCartney did provide backing vocals (uncredited) on "We Love You" (recorded during the Satanic Majesties Request sessions, but released as a single three months before the album). The Wyman-composed "In Another Land" was released as a single, with the artist credit listed as Bill Wyman, rather than the Rolling Stones (the B-Side, "The Lantern", was credited to the Rolling Stones).

The production, in particular, came in for harsh criticism from Jon Landau in the fifth issue of Rolling Stone, and Jimmy Miller (recommended by the album's engineer, Glyn Johns) was asked to produce the Stones' subsequent albums, on which they would return to the hard driving blues that earned them fame early in their career. In an April 1968 album review, Richard Corliss of the New York Times was also critical of the production value stating "... their imagination seems to have dried up when it comes to some of the arrangements. While still better than their previous ones, the arrangements are often ragged, fashionably monotonous and off-key." Despite this he gave the album an overall positive review, going as far as calling it a better concept album than Of Cabbages and Kings (1967, by Chad & Jeremy), The Beat Goes On (1968, by Vanilla Fudge) and even Sgt. Pepper's Lonely Hearts Club Band (1967, by the Beatles). In a 1970 Rolling Stone interview, Lennon commented on the album: "Satanic Majesties is Pepper. 'We Love You'... that's 'All You Need Is Love'."

Legacy and reappraisal 
{{Album ratings
| title = Retrospective professional reviews
| rev1 = AllMusic
| rev1score = 
| rev2 = Encyclopedia of Popular Music
| rev2score = 
| rev3 = Entertainment Weekly
| rev3Score = C
| rev4 = The Great Rock Discography
| rev4Score = 5/10
| rev5 = Louder
| rev5Score = 
| rev6 = "Record Collector| rev6score = 4/5
| rev7 = NME| rev7Score = 8/10
| rev8 = Pitchfork| rev8score = 7.8/10
| rev9 = The Rolling Stone Album Guide| rev9score = 
| rev10 = The Village Voice| rev10Score = B+
}}
Keith Richards himself has been critical of the album in later years. While he likes some of the songs ("2000 Light Years from Home", "Citadel" and "She's a Rainbow"), he stated, "the album was a load of crap." Mick Jagger disavowed the album in 1995, saying:  "it's not very good. It had interesting things on it, but I don't think any of the songs are very good. There's two good songs on it. The rest of them are nonsense." There are only two songs from the album which the Stones performed live, "2000 Light Years from Home" (1989–90 world tour, 2013 Glastonbury Festival), and "She's a Rainbow" (1997–98 Bridges to Babylon Tour and occasionally on concert tours in the late 2010s.)Satanic Majesties has been reassessed positively by critics. In a retrospective 1977 review, Robert Christgau of the Village Voice stated that the album "no doubt contains several great songs" despite negative reception from some. Stephen Thomas Erlewine of Pitchfork wrote that "Perhaps psychedelia wasn’t a natural fit for the earthbound Stones, but the dissonance between their gritty rhythms and ornate, precocious arrangements is enthralling, not in the least because there’s no other record—by the Stones or anybody else—that sounds quite like this." AllMusic's Bob Eder called the mono mix of the album a distinct improvement over the stereo version, describing it as transforming the maligned album into "superb, punky psychedelia." Richie Unterberger of AllMusic writes:Their Satanic Majesties Requests opening song "Sing This All Together" was featured in the stage and television productions of Paul Sills' Story Theatre (1970–71), in particular appearing as the TV version's theme song. This song was also covered by the Swedish band "Shakers" as early as March 1968 on a vinyl single, as the A-side. In 2008 it was included on a CD with "Shakers" entire catalog of songs titled "Samlat Skrammel". Todd Tamanend Clark released a proto-cyberpunk version of "2000 Light Years From Home" in 1975.  Punk/Goth pioneers The Damned covered "Citadel" on their 1981 Friday 13th (EP); guitarist Captain Sensible wanted to cover the entire album but singer Dave Vanian thought a single song was enough. California's Redd Kross also covered "Citadel" on their 1984 Teen Babes from Monsanto EP. Cibo Matto covered "Sing This All Together" on their album Super Relax (1997). The Ohio punk band Sister Ray included "Citadel" in many of their live sets. Sheffield new wave band The Comsat Angels also covered "Citadel" for BBC (Time Considered as a Helix of Precious Stones) and Dutch (Unravelled) radio sessions, and released it as a bonus 12" to "I'm Falling", and on their fifth album, 7 Day Weekend. The Yugoslav band Električni Orgazam covered the song "Citadel" in 1983 on their cover album Les Chansones Populaires. American neo-psychedelic band The Brian Jonestown Massacre paid tribute to the album with their fourth album Their Satanic Majesties' Second Request. "2000 Man" was covered by KISS on their 1979 album Dynasty featuring lead guitarist Ace Frehley on lead vocals.

In August 2002, Their Satanic Majesties Request'' was reissued in a new remastered CD, LP and DSD by ABKCO Records. In May 2011, the album was reissued on SHM-SACD. In 2017, a set containing two LPs (mono/stereo) as well as two SACDs (mono/stereo) was released. For the first time since the 2006 Japanese SACD release, the original 3D cover was recreated. In 2018, the album was reissued as part of the Record Store Day. The release contained a remastered stereo version of the album pressed on transparent colored vinyl (180g) and also featured the 3D-style sleeve.

Track listing

Personnel
Source:

The Rolling Stones
 Mick Jagger – lead vocals , backing vocals , percussion , maracas , tambourine 
 Keith Richards – electric guitar , backing vocals , acoustic guitar , bass guitar 
 Brian Jones – Mellotron ; saxophone ; vibraphone, jew's harp and flute ; organ ; electric dulcimer ; recorder ; backing vocals  harp 
 Bill Wyman – bass guitar; lead vocals and organ;  backing vocals  
 Charlie Watts – drums , tabla 

Additional personnel
 Nicky Hopkins – piano , organ , harpsichord 
 John Paul Jones – string arrangement 
 Ronnie Lane and Steve Marriott – backing vocals 
 Eddie Kramer – claves 
 Others, including Marianne Faithfull - probable backing vocals

Charts

Certifications

Notes

References

Further reading

External links 
 

1967 albums
The Rolling Stones albums
Decca Records albums
London Records albums
Albums recorded at Olympic Sound Studios
ABKCO Records albums
Psychedelic rock albums by English artists
Psychedelic pop albums
Acid rock albums